The Minister of Social Welfare is the Minister in charge of the Ministry of Social Welfare, Government of the People's Republic of Bangladesh. He is also the Minister of all departments and agencies under the Ministry of Social Welfare. This ministry was earlier known as the Ministry of Health and Social Welfare. The Ministry of Social Welfare was formed on 9 November 1989. Listed here are the names of all the ministers, advisors, state ministers and deputy ministers.

Minister in charge, Adviser and Minister of State

References

Ministry of Social Welfare (Bangladesh)
 
Bangladesh
Social Welfare
Lists of ministers by ministry of Bangladesh